Kaganovich is a Jewish surname. It comes from the Hebrew word “Cohen” which means Priest.

Kaganovich may refer to:

People
 Ida Rosenthal (born Ida Kaganovich, 1886–1973), a Russian-American dressmaker, businesswoman
 Der Nister (1884–1950), pen name of Pinchas Kaganovich (Kahanovich), a Yiddish author, philosopher, translator, and critic
 Lazar Kaganovich (1893–1991), Soviet politician

Other
 16131 Kaganovich (1999 XV97), a main-belt asteroid
 Qaraçuxur (also Imeni Kaganovicha, Kaganovich, Kaganovicha), a settlement and municipality in Baku, Azerbaijan
 Soviet cruiser Kaganovich, a Kirov-class battlecruiser
 Poliske, a town in the Chernobyl Exclusion Zone named Kaganovichi Pervye or Kahanovychi Pershi during the Soviet era

See also 
 Kagan (disambiguation)
 Kogen (disambiguation)
 Kogon (disambiguation)
 Kohen

Kohenitic surnames
Jewish surnames
Slavic-language surnames